For the Olympic Games until the 1992 Summer Olympics in Barcelona and 1992 Winter Olympics in Albertville, there have been demonstration or exhibition events that have occurred on various sports. Some of these sports later became Olympic sports such as basketball, canoeing, and short track speed skating. These are a list of other venues that hosted demonstration sports that did not become nor had never been official Olympic sports.

Summer Olympics

Winter Olympics

References

Demonstration events
Demonstration events